Hincks Wilderness Protection Area is a protected area in the Australian state of South Australia located in the gazetted locality of Hincks about  north of Port Lincoln and  south east of Lock on the Eyre Peninsula.  The wilderness protection area was proclaimed under the Wilderness Protection Act 1992 on 30 September 2004 on land excised from the Hincks Conservation Park.  

The following qualities have been identified by the government agency managing the wilderness protection area:Originally set aside as a flora and fauna reserve in 1941, it is one of the largest expanses of mallee on Eyre Peninsula. The area has recorded 420 species of vascular plants including 28 orchids. Of the 420 species, 91 (including four species of orchid) had not previously been recorded on any other reserve in South Australia. The wilderness protection area is dominated by Mallee, with a small portion covered by forest, woodland, or shrubland. Visitors occasionally travel through the reserve or camp on the North-South Track.

It is classified as an IUCN Category Ib protected area.

See also
 Protected areas of South Australia

References

External links
 Hincks Wilderness Protection Area webpage on protected planet    

Wilderness areas of South Australia
Protected areas established in 2004
2004 establishments in Australia
Eyre Peninsula
Eyre Yorke Block